Eve's Secret is a 1925 American silent romantic comedy film produced by Famous Players-Lasky and released by Paramount Pictures. It is based on a Broadway play, Moon-Flower, by Zoë Akins, adapted from a Hungarian play by Lajos Bíró. On Broadway Elsie Ferguson starred. Clarence Badger directed Betty Compson and Jack Holt.

Plot
As described in a film magazine review, the Duke of Poltava meets Eve, the daughter of a cobbler, and, wishing to marry her, sends her to Paris to be educated. She becomes the object of attention and the Duke fights many duels because of his jealousy concerning her. When she meets Pierre, a childhood chum, she dines with him, which incurs the wrath of the Duke. During the duel, the Duke, believing that she loves Pierre, permits himself to be struck. The wound is slight. Eve finds that she loves the Duke greatly, culminating in their marriage.

Cast

Preservation
An extant 35mm print of Eve's Secret is located at the Library of Congress.

References

External links

American silent feature films
Films directed by Clarence G. Badger
Paramount Pictures films
American films based on plays
1925 romantic comedy films
American romantic comedy films
American black-and-white films
Silent romantic comedy films
1920s American films
1920s English-language films
Silent American comedy films